Pierre-Antoine Tillard (born 19 September 1986) is a French slalom canoeist who has competed at the international level since 2009. He competes in C1 and C2. His partner in the C2 boat is usually Edern Le Ruyet.

He won a gold and a bronze medal at the 2018 European Championships in Prague. He finished third in the overall World Cup rankings in the C2 class in 2016. He was the Olympic substitute for the C1 event at the 2016 Summer Olympics in Rio de Janeiro.

World Cup individual podiums

References

External links

French male canoeists
1986 births
Living people